Bholapur is a village located in the Ludhiana East tehsil, of Ludhiana district, Punjab.

Administration
The village is administrated by a Sarpanch who is an elected representative of village as per constitution of India and Panchayati raj (India).

Villages in Ludhiana East Tehsil

External links
  Villages in Ludhiana East Tehsil

References

Villages in Ludhiana East tehsil